Cameron "Cam" Jackson (born February 27, 1951) is a Canadian politician. A Progressive Conservative, he was first elected to the Legislative Assembly of Ontario in 1985, and held the office of Member of Provincial Parliament (MPP) for Burlington until his resignation on September 28, 2006 to run for mayor of Burlington in the 2006 election. He served as mayor from 2006 to 2010 when he was defeated by Rick Goldring.

Background
Jackson was born in Hamilton, Ontario. His mother was Ukrainian Canadian. He was educated at McMaster University, although he left before graduating to take a job with the Ontario Conservative Party. Before entering politics, he was the Chief Executive Officer of the Metropolitan Hamilton Real Estate Board, and also worked for the Halton Housing Authority from 1975 to 1980. In 1996, he was named "Officer Brother of the Order of St. John of Jerusalem" by Canada's Governor-General. He also served as a trustee on the Halton Public School Board for ten years.

Provincial politics
Jackson was elected for the riding of Burlington South in the provincial election of 1985, defeating Liberal candidate Doug Redfearn by about 4,500 votes. He was a backbench supporter of the government of Frank Miller, which was defeated in the legislature shortly after the election. In late 1985, Jackson supported Alan Pope's unsuccessful bid to replace Miller as party leader.

Jackson was nearly defeated in the provincial election of 1987, defeating Liberal Bill Priestner by 605 votes. He won by a much greater margin in the 1990 election. The Tories finished in third place in both instances, behind the Liberals and the New Democratic Party.

The Progressive Conservatives returned to power in the 1995 provincial election, and Jackson was re-elected in Burlington South with over 70% of the popular vote.  He was made a Minister without Portfolio in the government of Mike Harris on June 26, 1995, with responsibility for the Workers Compensation Board. After a shuffle on August 16, 1996, he was given ministerial responsibility for Seniors. He was finally given a full portfolio on July 27, 1998, being made Ontario Minister of Long-Term Care and Seniors. Jackson was easily re-elected in the 1999 provincial election for the redistributed riding of Burlington.

On June 17, 1999, he was named Minister of Tourism.  He was named Minister of Citizenship with responsibility for Seniors on February 8, 2001, but returned to the Tourism portfolio (now retitled Tourism and Recreation) when Ernie Eves succeeded Mike Harris as Premier on April 15, 2002.  He was forced to resign on October 2, 2002 due to a controversy over his practice of billing the government for steak dinners and hotel stays. Jackson did not appear in public for weeks and there was speculation that he would not run for re-election. Jackson was fully exonerated of all allegations before the next election, and did retain his riding in the 2003 election (albeit with a greatly reduced majority) while dozens of other Tory MPPs lost their seats.

There had been speculation that Jackson would run to succeed Eves in the 2004 Ontario Progressive Conservative leadership election but in July, Jackson endorsed John Tory's candidacy for the position of party leader.

Cabinet positions

Mayor of Burlington
On September 28, 2006, Jackson announced both his retirement from provincial politics and his candidacy for Mayor of Burlington. He was elected in the 2006 municipal election, succeeding Rob MacIsaac. After just one term in office, he was defeated in the 2010 municipal election by Rick Goldring.

Electoral record

References

Notes

Citations

External links
 

1951 births
Living people
Mayors of Burlington, Ontario
McMaster University alumni
Members of the Executive Council of Ontario
Nelson High School (Ontario) alumni
Politicians from Hamilton, Ontario
Progressive Conservative Party of Ontario MPPs
21st-century Canadian politicians
Ontario school board trustees